The 1893 American Cup was the ninth edition of the soccer tournament organized by the American Football Association. The Pawtucket Free Wanderers won their first title by overcoming the New York Thistles in the final. This season operations shifted to New England with the elected committee represented by John Clark of Pawtucket as President, Joseph Brady of the East Ends as Vice President, John F. Geagan of the Rovers as Secretary, and Ephraim Mayes of the Olympics as Treasurer.

Entrants

Western Section:
 RoversBayonne, New Jersey
 ThistlesNew York
 CaledoniansNewark, New Jersey
 Young Men's Christian UnionKearny, New Jersey
 ThistlePaterson, New Jersey
 True BluesPaterson, New Jersey
 StarsKearny, New Jersey

Eastern Section:
 ClippersFall River, Massachusetts
 ConanicutsFall River, Massachusetts
 East EndsFall River, Massachusetts
 OlympicsFall River, Massachusetts
 RoversFall River, Massachusetts
 Free WanderersPawtucket, Rhode Island
 ThistlesPawtucket, Rhode Island
 British HosieryThornton, Rhode Island
 Manville AthleticsManville, Rhode Island
 GorhamsProvidence, Rhode Island
 RoversNew Bedford, Massachusetts 
 RangersBarre, Vermont

First round
The first round draw took place at the AFA meeting at the Wilbur House in Fall River, Massachusetts on August 21, 1892. The games of the first round were scheduled to be played on or before the second Saturday in November.

British Hosiery forfeited not having registered their players on time.

Both teams withdrew.

Free Wanderers: G Shea, FB Gregory, Jack Stuart, HB Reed, Johnson, Sam Jenkins, RW Jeffrey, Davis, LW Slater, Watson, C Al Jenkins. East Ends: G James Irving, FB George Morris, Bernard Fagan, HB James Hughes, Thomas Philbin, Fred Scott, LW Ernest Borden, John Sunderland, RW John Tobin, Henry Farrell, C James Pemberton.

Gorhams: GK McFarlane, FB Muirhead, Greyhurst, HB McConnell, Bennett, Fanning, LW Greene, O'Neil, C Buck, RW Montgomery, Robertson. Rovers: GK McGuigan, FB Buckley, Culligan, HB Barlow, Pickup, Burgess, LW Kenney, Bannister, C Smith, RW Randall, Schofield.

Pawtucket Thistle withdrew.

Clippers: GK Sullivan, FB Melville, Smith, HB P. Knowe, Callery, Coggeshall, LW Horsefall, F. Swan, C F. Knowe, RW J.Sullivan, J.Swan. Rovers: GK Crowley, FB Finian, Seddon, HB O'Rourke, Lyons, Beattie, LW Taylor, Cartmill, C Reed, RW Duckworth, Calbert.

Second round
The second round draw took place at the AFA meeting in the St. Charles Hotel in Pawtucket, Rhode Island on November 19, 1892. The games of the second round were scheduled to be played on or before the second Saturday in January. The Olympics drew a bye.

The teams met on February 18 at the Recreation grounds in Haledon, however no referee showed up. Given that there was also heavy snow on the grounds, the teams agreed to play a friendly match, Paterson winning 4-0. Bayonne eventually cancelled allowing Paterson to advance.

Free Wanderers: G Shea, FB Gregory, Jack Stuart, HB Reed, Jeffrey, Sam Jenkins, RW Whiteside, Davis, LW Slater, Watson, C Al Jenkins. Rovers: GK Cunningham, FB Finlan, Seddon, HB O'Rourke, Lyons, Beattie, LW Welsh, Cartmill, C James Reed, RW W.Brierly, Woolley.

Third round 

Olympics: GK Farrell, FB Lee, Spencer, HB Lagrosse, Morris, Fortin, LW Taylor, Leveque, C Wilde, RW Cunliffe, Tomlinson. Rovers: GK Murtaugh, FB Culligan, Buckley, HB Pickup, Whittaker, Barlow, LW Kenny, Bannister, C M.Harrington, RW Randall, Gavin.

Semifinals 

Paterson: GK , FB T. McAuley, T. Turner(c), HB McIzatt, S. Findley, E. Ackerman, LW Ingram, J. Turner, C Morton, RW Wilson, M. McAuley.

Rovers: GK Murtaugh, FB Culligan, Buckley, HB Pickup, Whittaker, Barlow, LW Kenny, Bannister, C Mike Harrington, RW Randall, Gavan. Free Wanderers: GK Shea, FB Gregory, Jack Stuart, HB Reed, Johnson, Sam Jenkins, RW Jeffrey, Davis, LW Slater, Watson, C Al Jenkins.

replay

Final 
The New York Thistles, the previous year's runner up, entered the final undefeated in the season with 17 wins and two tie games, boasting 123 goals scored and 15 against. The Pawtucket Free Wanderers, along with making their first American Cup final appearance, had won the New England League three weeks prior, finishing in first ahead of the East Ends, Olympics, Rovers, and Clippers of Fall River and the New Bedford Rovers. 

Free Wanderers: GK Shea, FB Gregory, Jack Stuart, HB Reed, Johnson, Sam Jenkins, RW Jeffrey, Davis, LW Slater, Watson, C Al Jenkins. Thistle: GK Armstrong, FB Patrick, Foy, HB Adam, Entwistle, Willie, RW Jameson, McConnell, LW McGee, McKinley, C McGovern.

References 

1893